Arrillaga is a surname. Notable people include:

Blanca Renée Arrillaga (1917–2011), Uruguayan chemist, botanist, professor and agrostologist
Eduardo Arrillaga (born 1961), Mexican rower
John Arrillaga (1937–2022), American real estate billionaire
José Joaquín de Arrillaga, seventh (1792–1794) and tenth (1800–1814) governor of Alta California
Laura Arrillaga-Andreessen, American philanthropist, daughter of John
Maria Arrillaga, Puerto Rican poet